The six-rays model is applied in an urban or indoor environment where a radio signal transmitted will encounter some objects that produce reflected, refracted or scattered copies of the transmitted signal. These are called multipath signal components, they are attenuated, delayed and shifted from the original signal (LOS) due to a finite number of reflectors with known location and dielectric properties, LOS and multipath signal are summed at the receiver. 

This model approach the propagation of electromagnetic waves by representing wavefront as simple particles. Thus reflection, refraction and scattering effects are approximated using simple geometric equation instead Maxwell's wave equations.[1]

The simplest model is two-rays which predicts signal variation resulting from a ground reflection interfering with the loss path. This model is applicable in isolated areas with some reflectors, such as rural roads or hallway.

The above two-rays approach can easily be extended to add as many rays as required. We may add rays bouncing off each side of a street in an urban corridor, leading to a six-rays model. The deduction of the six-rays model is presented below.

Mathematical deduction

Antennas of heights equal located in the center of the street 

For the analysis of antennas with equal heights then , determining that for the following two rays that are reflected once in the wall, the point in which they collide is equal to said height . Also for each ray that is reflected in the wall, there is another ray that is reflected in the ground in a number equal to the reflections in the wall plus one, in these rays there are diagonal distances for each reflection and the sum of these distances is denominated .

The mathematical model of propagation of six rays is based on the model of two rays, to find the equations of each ray involved. The distance  that separates the two antennas, is equal to the first direct ray   or line of sight (LOS), that is:

For  y   the deduction and the distances are equals, therefore:

Antennas of heights equal located in any point of the street 
For the other four rays it applies the next mathematical process:

For likeness of triangles in the top view for model is determined the equation :

For  and  the deduction and the distances are equal then:

Antennas of heights different located in the center of the street 
For antennas of different heights with rays that rebound in the wall, it is noted that the wall is the half point, where the two transmitted rays they fall on such wall. The diagonal  distance  d´  that separates the two antennas divides in two distances through of the wall, one is called  and the other .

Antennas of heights different located in any point of the street 

For the mathematical model of six-ray propagation for antennas of different heights located at any point in the street, there is a direct distance  that separates the two antennas, the first ray is formed by applying The Pythagorean theorem from the difference of heights of the antennas with respect to the line of sight:

The second ray or reflected ray is calculated as the first ray but the heights of the antennas are added to form the right triangle.

For deducing the third ray it is calculated the angle between the direct distance   and the distance of line of sight 

Now deducing the height that subtraction of the wall with respect the height of the receiver called  by similarity the triangles:

  
                                 

By similarity of triangles it can deduce the distance where the ray hits the wall until the perpendicular of the receiver called a achieved:

  
                

By similarity of the triangles can be deduced the equation of the fourth ray:

For  y   the deduction and the distances are equal, therefore:

Free-space path loss on the model 

Consider a transmitted signal in the free space a receptor located a distance d of the transmitter. One may add rays bouncing off each side of a street in an urban corridor, leading to a six-rays model, with rays ,  and  each one having a direct and a ground bouncing ray.

For the rays rebound outside the earth and on each side of the street, this assumption is fairly safe, but in general will have remembered that these assumptions mean the dispersion of delays (diffusion of the values ) is smaller than symbols speed of transmission.

Free-space path loss of six rays model is defined as:

    is the wavelength.

 Is the time difference between the two paths.

 Is the coefficient of ground reflection.

 Gain of the transmitter.

 Receiver gain.

See also 
Two-ray ground-reflection model
Ten-rays model
Ray tracing (physics)

References 

Antennas
Radio frequency propagation model